The Institute of Technology at Linköping University, or Tekniska högskolan vid Linköpings universitet (formerly Linköpings tekniska högskola, LiTH), is the faculty of science and engineering of Linköping University, located in Linköping and Norrköping in Sweden. Since its start in 1969, LiTH has had close ties with the Swedish transport and electronics industry in general and with Ericsson and SAAB in particular.  The faculty has 1,400 staff members, out of whom 125 are professors, and 470 are lecturers with a PhD.  The total number of students exceeds 12,000, with more than half being in post-graduate programs.

LiTH focuses its research and education in the areas of information technology, industrial engineering and management, materials technology, biomedical engineering, applied physics, production engineering and electronics. Interdisciplinary approaches and applied science are conducted in cooperation with the industry.

Notable alumni

Carl-Henric Svanberg, chairman BP, former CEO Ericsson, (Applied physics and Electrical Engineering)
Mikael Ohlsson, CEO IKEA, (Industrial engineering and Management)
Magnus Hall, President and CEO Holmen, (Industrial Engineering and Management)
Håkan Eriksson, chief scientific officer Ericsson, (Applied Physics and Electrical Engineering)
Åke Svensson, former CEO Saab, (Applied Physics and Electrical Engineering)
Mats Oretorp, CEO Dell Sweden, Dell AB, (Industrial Engineering and Management)
Björn Blomberg, CEO Swedfund, (Industrial Engineering and Management)
Jan-Eric Sundgren, former rector Chalmers, (Applied Physics and Electrical Engineering)
Mille Millnert, former rector Linköping University, (Applied Physics and Electrical Engineering)
Founders of Configura Sverige AB, (Computer science engineering)
Founders of Intentia (part of Lawson Software), (Industrial Engineering and Management)
Founders of Industrial and Financial Systems, (Industrial Engineering and Management)

Educational programmes
Master of Science programmes at Campus Valla:
Aeronautical Engineering
Industrial Engineering and Management
Sustainability Engineering and Management 
Socware (System-On-Chip)
Computer Science
Computer Science and Engineering
Information Technology
Chemical Biology
Engineering Biology
Mechanical Engineering
Applied Physics and Electrical Engineering
Design and Product Development

Master of Science programmes at Campus Norrköping
Electronics Design Engineering
Communication and Transport Engineering
Media Technology and Engineering

See also
 Chalmers University of Technology
 Royal Institute of Technology
 Luleå University of Technology
 Lund Institute of Technology
 Umeå Institute of Technology
 List of universities in Sweden
 List of test pilot schools

Notes

External links

 

University departments in Sweden
Engineering universities and colleges in Sweden
Linköping University